Upton, is a small hamlet and former civil parish, now in the parish of Sheepy, in the Hinckley and Bosworth district, in the county of Leicestershire, England. It is on the Leicestershire and Warwickshire border west of Shenton and south-east of Sibson. In 1931 the parish had a population of 104.

The local area is predominantly agricultural. Upton is a ribbon development with a mixture of Georgian, Victorian and more modern properties along Main Road. There is a caravan park and restaurant both operated by Upton Barn. The hamlet has one post box.

Administratively, Upton falls under Hinckley and Bosworth Borough Council and Leicestershire County Council

History 
Upton was formerly a township in the parish of Sibson, from 1866 Upton was a civil parish in its own right, on 1 April 1935 the parish was abolished to form Sheepy.

Longhorn Cattle in Upton 
In 1745, George Chapman following the work of Robert Bakewell (farmer) started a Longhorn cattle herd in Upton that proved prize winning and influential over the development of the breed during this period. The Chapman family continued breeding Longhorns into the mid 19th century

Cheese in Upton 
Red Leicestershire cheese is made in Upton by the Leicestershire Handmade Cheese Co. The cheese is marketed under the ‘Sparkenhoe’ name. Cheese making began in November 2005. Sparkenhoe was the name of one of the Longhorn bulls bred by the Chapman family.

References

External links
 Leicestershire Handmade Cheese Co

Hamlets in Leicestershire
Former civil parishes in Leicestershire
Hinckley and Bosworth